An Empty Dream

An Empty Dream (1922 film), List of Chinese films before 1930
An Empty Dream (ko), 1965 Korean remake of the Japanese film Daydream (1964 film)
"An Empty Dream", song from Tarja Turunen discography